Fedor Alekseyevich Gorst (born May 31, 2000 in Moscow) is a Russian professional pool player.

Career
In December 2018, Gorst reached 8th in the World Pool-Billiard Association (WPA) world rankings. Gorst won the U19 8-Ball European Pool Championship in 2017, before winning the 2018 Treviso Open on the Euro Tour. Gorst is also a Junior 9-ball world champion, winning the 2017 WPA World Nine-ball Junior Championship in the boys (Under 19) event.

Gorst won the 2019 WPA World Nine-ball Championship, defeating Chang Jung-lin in the final 13–11.

Titles and Achievements
 2023 CSI U.S. Open 8-Ball Championship 
 2023 CSI U.S. Open 10-Ball Championship 
 2023 Skinny Bob's One Pocket Classic
 2023 Skinny Bob's 9-Ball Classic
 2023 Derby City Classic Master of the Table
 2023 Derby City Classic 9-Ball
 2023 Derby City Classic Bank Pool
 2023 Mini Derb Open 10-Ball
 2023 Mini Derb Open 9-Ball
 2023 Mini Derb Open One Pocket
 2022 Pro Billiard Series Ohio Open 
 2022 River City Open 10-Ball Championship
 2022 Brendan Crockett Memorial
 2022 Racks on the Rocks One Pocket 
 2022 Racks on the Rocks 10-Ball
 2022 International Open Bigfoot 10-Ball Challenge 
 2022 Pro Billiard Series Arizona Open
 2022 CSI U.S. Open 10-Ball Championship 
 2022 Hannah Choi Memorial 10-Ball
 2022 Midwest Bar Table Classic
 2022 Midwest Open 10-Ball Championship
 2022 Midwest 10-Ball Invitational
 2022 Derby City Classic Master of the Table
 2022 Derby City Classic Bank Pool
 2022 Derby City Classic One Pocket 
 2021 Pro Billiard Series Arizona Open
 2021 Rack N Grill 9-Ball Shootout 
 2021 Midwest 10-Ball Invitational
 2021 Russian Pool Championship 10-Ball
 2021 Russian Pool Championship 8-Ball
 2021 European Pool Championship 14.1
 2020 Mosconi Cup
 2020 Russian Pool Championship 10-Ball
 2020 Russian Pool Championship 9-Ball
 2020 Russian Pool Championship 8-Ball
 2020 Athens 9-Ball Open
 2019 WPA World Nine-ball Championship 
 2019 Russian Pool Championship 10-Ball
 2019 Russian Pool Championship 9-Ball
 2019 Mezz Bucharest Open 
 2019 European Pool Championship 9-Ball
 2018 Russian Pool Championship 10-Ball
 2018 Euro Tour Treviso Open
 2017 Russian Pool Championship 14.1
 2017 WPA World Nine-ball Junior championship

References

External links

Russian pool players
Place of birth missing (living people)
2000 births
Living people
WPA World Nine-ball Champions